"Unicorn" is a song by Israeli singer Noa Kirel, released on 8 March 2023. The song is set to represent Israel in the Eurovision Song Contest 2023 after the artist was internally selected by the Israeli Public Broadcasting Corporation (IPBC/Kan), Israel's broadcaster for the Eurovision Song Contest.

Eurovision Song Contest

Internal selection 
A special committee consisting of members from Kan, music editors and external representatives each suggested two artists from 78 initially considered based on airplay on Gimel and Galgalatz, and nominees for Singer of the Year and Group of the Year awards in 2019, 2020 and 2021. On 11 July 2022, Kan announced that Noa Kirel had topped the list with Mergui placing second. Despite Kirel stating the following day that she and her team had yet to make a decision, Israeli television channel HaHadashot 12 reported in early August 2022 that the invitation had been accepted by the singer, which was later confirmed during a press conference held at the Hotel Carlton in Tel Aviv on 10 August 2022.

On 17 January 2023, Kirel revealed that her song for the Eurovision Song Contest 2023 would be titled "Unicorn". The song was premiered on 8 March during a special televised broadcast titled  ("Our Song for Eurovision") on Kan 11, as well as online via kan.org.il.

At Eurovision 
According to Eurovision rules, all nations with the exceptions of the host country and the "Big Five" (France, Germany, Italy, Spain and the United Kingdom) are required to qualify from one of two semi-finals in order to compete for the final; the top ten countries from each semi-final progress to the final. The European Broadcasting Union (EBU) split up the competing countries into six different pots based on voting patterns from previous contests, with countries with favourable voting histories put into the same pot. On 31 January 2023, an allocation draw was held, which placed each country into one of the two semi-finals, and determined which half of the show they would perform in. Israel has been placed into the first semi-final, to be held on 9 May 2023, and has been scheduled to perform in the second half of the show.

References 

2023 singles
2023 songs
Eurovision songs of 2023
Eurovision songs of Israel